A Ringgold Identifier (Ringgold ID or RIN) is a persistent numeric unique identifier for organizations in the publishing industry supply chain. Ringgold's Identify Database includes over 500,000 Ringgold IDs representing organizations and consortia who acquire scholarly publications and content.

The Ringgold ID was introduced in 2003. Ringgold developed it in response to an issue raised by Oxford University Press, namely how to identify institutional subscribers unambiguously. The system is owned and administered by Ringgold, Inc. and Ringgold, Ltd., who also publish a taxonomy for classifying the subject interests of the listed organizations.

Ringgold is an International Standard Name Identifier (ISNI) registration agency, and as such the US National Information Standards Organization (NISO) recommended that Ringgold IDs be used to identify organizations involved in scholarly communications. Ringgold Identifiers are used by ORCID, to record the institutional affiliation of individual researchers.

References

External links 

 
 Aligned ISNI and Ringgold identifiers for institutions at Zenodo

Identifiers
Academic publishing
Library cataloging and classification
Oxford University Press
2003 introductions